José Luis Pérez Valencia (4 August 1925 – 11 May 1963) was a Mexican wrestler. He competed in the men's freestyle lightweight at the 1948 Summer Olympics.

References

1925 births
1963 deaths
Mexican male sport wrestlers
Olympic wrestlers of Mexico
Wrestlers at the 1948 Summer Olympics
Wrestlers at the 1951 Pan American Games
Pan American Games bronze medalists for Mexico
Pan American Games medalists in wrestling
Medalists at the 1951 Pan American Games
20th-century Mexican people